Clarence H. Carter (May 19, 1874 – May 7, 1958) was a member of the Wisconsin State Assembly.

Carter was born in Vernon County, Wisconsin. He went to the public schools and to high school. Carter was in the insurance and tobacco buying business. Carter was first elected to the Assembly in 1916. Other positions he held include Chairman of the Vernon County Board of Supervisors. He was a Republican. In 1946, Carter moved to DeForest, Wisconsin from Readstown. Carter died in a hospital in Madison, Wisconsin on May 7, 1958. He was buried in Readstown Cemetery.

References

External links
 

People from Vernon County, Wisconsin
Businesspeople from Wisconsin
County supervisors in Wisconsin
Republican Party members of the Wisconsin State Assembly
1874 births
1958 deaths
People from DeForest, Wisconsin